Walter Franklyn Matthews (21 March 1900 – 16 September 1986) was a Progressive Conservative party member of the House of Commons of Canada. Born in Reston, Manitoba, he was a merchant by career.

He was first elected at the Nanaimo riding in the 1958 general election, after an unsuccessful attempt there in the 1957 election. He served one term, the 24th Canadian Parliament, before the riding was renamed Nanaimo—Cowichan—The Islands. Matthews was defeated in the 1962 election by Colin Cameron and again in 1963 and 1965 Canadian federal election.

References

External links
 

1900 births
1986 deaths
Members of the House of Commons of Canada from British Columbia
Progressive Conservative Party of Canada MPs